Catopocerini is a tribe of eyeless soil fungivore beetles in the family Leiodidae. There are at least 2 genera and more than 40 described species in Catopocerini.

Genera
These two genera belong to the tribe Catopocerini:
 Catopocerus Motschulsky, 1870
 Pinodytes Horn, 1880

References

Further reading

 
 
 
 

Leiodidae
Articles created by Qbugbot